Habia una vez... is the fifth album of Enanitos Verdes published in 1989. This was the album announcing the dissolution of the group. Marciano Cantero began his career as a soloist. This disc was dedicated to Roberto Cirigliano, Cantero's press agent who died in an accident.

Track listing 

 Típico domingo [Typical Sunday]
 Sólo quiero estar contigo [I Only Want To Be With You]
 Amor sangriento [Bloody Love]
 Si es tan fácil dejarme [If It Is So Easy To Leave Me]
 Igual a mí [Same To Me]
 No me puedo conformar [I Can Not Control Myself]
 El mismo juego [The Same Game]
 Buscando la manera [Looking The Way]
 Shunkti
 Pasión de nácar

References 
 http://aunsigocantando.blogspot.com/2006/11/haba-una-vez-1989.html

1989 albums
Enanitos Verdes albums